{{DISPLAYTITLE:C5H10O5}}
The molecular formula C5H10O5 may refer to:
 Apiose
 Aldopentoses
 Arabinose
 Lyxose
 Ribose
 Xylose
 1,2,3,4,5-Cyclopentanepentol
 Ketopentoses
 Ribulose
 Xylulose